Hugo Reyne (born in 1961) is a contemporary French recorder player, oboist and conductor. He is the founder and music director of La Simphonie du Marais.

Biography 
Born in Paris, Hugo Reyne began learning the flute and oboe at a very young age. In 1984, he won the first prize for chamber music at the Bruges International Chamber Music Competition. In the 1980s, Hugo Reyne played flute and oboe in most of the Parisian baroque ensembles, and from 1983 to 1996 he played the 1st flute at the Arts Florissants under the direction of William Christie. He has worked with conductors such as Frans Brüggen, Philippe Herreweghe, Gustav Leonhardt and Jordi Savall.

In 1987 he founded his historical interpretation ensemble, La Simphonie du Marais and was particularly interested in French lyrical music. Since 2003 Hugo Reyne has been artistic director of the Musiques at the  festival in Saint-Sulpice-le-Verdon.

Hugo Reyne devotes a large part of his time to musicological research, as well as to the publishing of old scores, he is also a collector of flutes and possesses a hundred instruments. For his work on the French musical heritage, he was awarded the title of Chevalier de l'Ordre des Arts et des Lettres in 1998.

Discography (Musiques à la Chabotterie) 
 2006:  by Jean-Philippe Rameau
 2007: Ulysse by Jean-Féry Rebel
 2008: Musiques au temps de Richelieu
 2008: Haendel: 6 Concertos for flute
 2009: Concerts mis en simphonie Jean Philippe Rameau, orchestrated version of harpsichord pieces
 2009: Viennoiseries musicales
 2010: Atys by Jean-Baptiste Lully
 2012: Charpentier: Music for Molière's comedies
 2012: Nais, opera for peace by Jean Philippe Rameau
 2013: Vivaldi: 6 concertos for flute
 2014: Rameau: Les Indes galantes
 2016: Bach: Brandenburg Concertos

External links 
Biography of Hugo Reyne on the website "Sinfonie du Marais"
interview with Hugo Reyne, à propos Naïs by Rameau (2011)
 Hugo Reyne on Discogs
 Hugo Reyne, trentenaire baroqueux lui aussi on ForumOpera
 Hugo Reyne on France Musique (1)
 Hugo Reyne on France Musique (2)
 Portrait Hugo Reyne - La Simphonie du Marais on YouTube

1961 births
Living people
French recorder players
French classical flautists
French classical oboists
Male oboists
French male conductors (music)
Chevaliers of the Ordre des Arts et des Lettres
Musicians from Paris
21st-century French conductors (music)
21st-century French male musicians
21st-century flautists